RAM MK3 (RAM 2000) is a light armored vehicle designed by IAI RAMTA. It is based on a 4×4 wheeled monocoque chassis.

History
The vehicle was also listed for sale under Mahindra Defense Systems with plans to make the RAM MK3 under license for a future Indian military contract.

Operational history

The RAM Mk 3 was used in Chadian and Senegalese military operations. Chadian RAM Mk3s were used during the Chadian Civil War that ended in 2010 and during the 2013 Chadian intervention in Mali War.

Senegalese RAM Mk3s were deployed with UNOCI in Ivory Coast.

Variants

Anti-Tank
The RAM Mk3 AT is equipped with 4-8 LAHAT laser guided anti-tank missiles. Unlike other armored vehicles, which have the engine at the front or under the protected cabin, RAM places the entire power-pack – engine, automatic transmission and transfer cases at the rear.

Users 

 : 5 delivered in 2008 for the presidential guard
 : ~42 delivered in 2006-2008
 
 : 2
 : 7
 : 6 delivered in 2006
 : 8
 
 : 7 delivered for Peruvian Naval Infantry in 2016.
 : 55, in service with Army and Gendarmerie
 : 150 vehicles ordered in 2006 and delivered in 2009; for usage by SWAT, Gendarmerie and Anti-Drug Branch

See also
 RBY MK 1

References

External links
 Official IAI page

Armoured fighting vehicles of Israel
Armoured personnel carriers of Israel
Armoured fighting vehicles of the post–Cold War period
Armoured cars of Israel
All-wheel-drive vehicles
Military trucks
Off-road vehicles
Military vehicles introduced in the 2000s